The Lost World is a 1925 American silent fantasy giant monster adventure film adapted from Arthur Conan Doyle's 1912 novel of the same name. The film was produced and distributed by First National Pictures, a major Hollywood studio at the time, and stars Wallace Beery as Professor Challenger. It was directed by Harry O. Hoyt and featured pioneering stop motion special effects by Willis O'Brien, a forerunner of his work on the original King Kong. Doyle appears in a frontispiece to the film, absent from some extant prints.

In 1998, The Lost World was deemed "culturally, historically or aesthetically significant" by the Library of Congress and selected for preservation in the United States National Film Registry. Because of its age the film has come into the public domain, so that anyone may freely copy it for a commercial purpose.

Plot
From a lost expedition to a plateau in the borders of Peru, Brazil and Colombia, Paula White brings the journal of her father, explorer Maple White, to the eccentric Professor Challenger in London. The journal features sketches of dinosaurs which is enough proof for Challenger to publicly announce that dinosaurs still walk the earth. Met with ridicule at an academic meeting at the Zoological Hall, Challenger reluctantly accepts a newspaper's offer to finance a mission to rescue Maple White. Professor Challenger, Paula White, sportsman Sir John Roxton, news reporter Edward Malone (who is a friend of Roxton and wishes to go on the expedition to impress his fiancée), a skeptical professor Summerlee, an Indian servant Zambo, and Challenger's butler Austin leave for the plateau.

At their campsite at the base of the plateau, the explorers are shocked when a large rock falls, sent their way by an Apeman perched on top of an overhead ledge. As the crew look up to see their attacker, Challenger spies overhead a Pteranodon (mistakenly calling it a Pterodactyl) eating a young Toxodon alive which proves that the statements in Maple White's diary are true. Leaving Zambo and Austin at the camp, they cross a chasm onto the plateau by cutting down a tree and using it as a bridge, but it is knocked over by a Brontosaurus, leaving them trapped.

The explorers witness various life-and-death struggles between the prehistoric beasts of the plateau. An Allosaurus attacks a Trachodon, and knocks it into a bog. The Allosaurus then attacks, and is driven off by a Triceratops. Eventually, the Allosaurus makes its way to the campsite and attacks the exploration party. It is finally driven off by Ed who tosses a torch into its mouth. Convinced that the camp is not safe, Ed climbs a tree to look for a new location, but is attacked by the apeman. Roxton succeeds in shooting the apeman, but the creature is merely wounded and escapes before he can finish him off. Meanwhile, an Agathaumas is attacked by the Allosaurus, and gores it to death. Suddenly, a Tyrannosaurus attacks and kills the Agathaumas, along with an unfortunate Pteranodon.

The explorers then make preparations to live on the plateau potentially indefinitely. Challenger designs a catapult to defend the camp. During a search for Maple White, Roxton finds his remains, confirming his death. It is at this time that Ed confesses his love for Paula and the two are unofficially wed by Summerlee who used to be a minister.

Shortly afterwards, as the paleontologists are observing the Brontosaurus, an Allosaurus attacks it and the Brontosaurus falls off the edge of the plateau, becoming trapped in a mud bank at the base of the plateau. Soon afterwards, a volcano erupts causing a mass stampede among the giant creatures of the lost world. The crew is saved when Paula's pet monkey Jocko climbs up the plateau carrying a rope. The crew use the rope to pull up a rope ladder constructed by Zambo and Austin and then climb down.

As Ed makes his descent, he is again attacked by the apeman who pulls the rope ladder. The apeman is again shot and finally killed by Roxton. They discover the Brontosaurus that had been pushed off the plateau had landed softly in the mud of the river, trapped but still alive, and Challenger manages to bring it back to London, as he wants to put it on display as proof of his story.

However, while being unloaded from the ship, the spooked and disoriented animal escapes and causes havoc until it reaches Tower Bridge, where its massive weight causes a collapse, and it swims down the River Thames. Challenger is morose as the creature leaves. Ed discovers that the love he left in London has married in his absence, allowing him and Paula to be together. Roxton morosely but gallantly hides his love for Paula as Paula and Ed leave together, while two passersby note: "That's Sir John Roxton – sportsman."

Cast

Bestiary

Prehistoric animals

 Agathaumas (seen in battle with Allosaurus and Tyrannosaurus and is based on a hypothetical restoration by Charles R. Knight,)
 Allosaurus (main carnivorous dinosaur seen, attacking Trachodon and Triceratops among others)
 Apeman (menaces the team of explorers)
 Brachiosaurus (seen during the volcanic eruption, one of which was attacked by a Tyrannosaurus)
 Brontosaurus (The main antagonist. After falling into a bog at the conclusion of a fight with an Allosaurus, one is captured and taken to civilization, where it escapes and terrorizes the city)
 Edmontosaurus (is preyed upon by the Allosaurus and called by synonym Trachodon or Anatosaurus)
 Pteranodon (the first prehistoric animal seen by the team of explorers)
 Stegosaurus (one disturbs the Agathaumas before the fight with the Allosaurus and Tyrannosaurus. It escaped the volcano eruption)
 Toxodon (a juvenile was seen being eaten alive by the Pteranodon. It is the only prehistoric mammal that is not a primate they find on the plateau)
 Triceratops (shown to be capable of handling an Allosaurus in battle)
 Tyrannosaurus (is seen to have little trouble bringing down Agathaumas, as well as having a taste for a Pteranodon that swoops in too close. One fights with a Brachiosaurus in the eruption scene. Like the film Fantasia, it is shown with three fingers.)

Other animals on the plateau
 Mesopithecus live-acted by a Capuchin monkey
 Chimpanzee (helps the apeman antagonize the explorers)
 Crane
 Laughing owl live-acted by a horned owl
 Feathered Hylonomus
 Peccary
 Spider monkey

Animals in the Amazon
 Anaconda
 Caiman or alligator
 Jaguar (stock footage)
 Peccary
 Python
 Scarlet macaw
 Spectacled bears (erroneously identified as "spectacle cave bears")
 Two-toed sloth (stock footage)
 Three-toed sloth

Production

This was the first feature-length film made in the United States, possibly the world, to feature model animation as the primary special effect, or stop motion animation in general. Willis H. O'Brien had previously, in 1918, worked on a film called The Ghost of Slumber Mountain that used stop motion photography. In The Lost World, he combined animated dinosaurs with live-action footage of human beings, but at first he was able to do this only by separating the frame into two parts (also known as split screen). As work went on, O'Brien's technique grew better and he could combine live-action and stop-motion footage in the same part of the screen.

For the live action scenes, an open sewer behind the MGM studio in Los Angeles was used as a river.

The dinosaurs of this film were based on the artwork of Charles R. Knight. Some of the dinosaur models used in the film came into the possession of collector Forrest J Ackerman.

Doyle frequently mentioned that Professor Challenger, not Sherlock Holmes, was his favorite character among his creations.

Reception

It received 100 % Rotten Tomatoes. In 1922, Conan Doyle showed O'Brien's test reel to a meeting of the Society of American Magicians, which included Harry Houdini. The astounded audience watched footage of a Triceratops family, an attack by an Allosaurus and some Stegosaurus footage. Doyle refused to discuss the film's origins. On the next day, The New York Times ran a front-page article about it, saying "(Conan Doyle's) monsters of the ancient world, or of the new world which he has discovered in the ether, were extraordinarily lifelike. If fakes, they were masterpieces".

In April 1925, on a London-Paris flight by Imperial Airways, The Lost World became the first film to be shown to airline passengers. As film stock of the era was nitrate and highly flammable, this was a risky undertaking on a wood and fabric-hulled plane, a converted WW1 bomber, the Handley-Page O 400.

This is the first dinosaur-oriented film hit, and it led to other dinosaur films, from King Kong to the Jurassic Park series. Michael Crichton's sequel to Jurassic Park was named The Lost World, in homage to Doyle's novel and film.

American Film Institute recognition
 AFI's 100 Years...100 Thrills – Nominated
 AFI's 10 Top 10 – Nominated Fantasy Film

Restorations
 George Eastman House – Laserdisc preservation with stills showing missing scenes
 George Eastman House – Film restoration using materials from Czech National Film Archive. Some sequences still missing and some inadvertently left out
 David Shepard, Serge Bromberg – DVD version using Kodascope prints, Czech archive materials and trailers. Like the George Eastman House restoration, some sequences are still missing and some inadvertently left out
 Flicker Alley – Blu-ray version of new 2K restoration (from various sources – original 35 mm nitrate copy, safety print, various 16 mm copies, etc.) with around eight min. of recently discovered footage and a new full orchestra score by Robert Israel (produced by Serge Bromberg of Lobster Films and dedicated to David Shepard of Film Preservation Associates)

Copyright

The Lost World entered the public domain on January 1, 1954, after 28 years of protection plus the remainder of the final calendar year. Although 95 years of protection was possible for works published in 1925, protection beyond 28 years required, at the time, a renewal with the US copyright office during the 28th year. The copyright of The Lost World was not renewed.

Any elements of the film that were not released in 1925, and were not released during the lifetime of the movie's producer, have 70 years of copyright protection after the death of the producer. The producer, Earl Hudson, died in 1959, so any such film elements will enter the public domain on January 1, 2030.

See also
 List of stop-motion films
 List of rediscovered films
 List of incomplete or partially lost films
 Stark Mad (1929)
 King Kong (1933)
 Journey to the Beginning of Time (1955)

References

External links

 The Lost World essay  by Brian Taves on the National Film Registry website
 
 
 
 
 
 
 "The Lost World" essay by Daniel Eagan in America's Film Legacy: The Authoritative Guide to the Landmark Movies in the National Film Registry, A&C Black, 2010 , pp. 96–97

Giant monster films
1925 adventure films
1920s fantasy films
1920s science fiction films
1925 films
American adventure films
American black-and-white films
American fantasy films
American monster movies
American silent feature films
Articles containing video clips
Films about dinosaurs
1920s English-language films
Films based on British novels
Films directed by Harry O. Hoyt
Films set in Brazil
Films set in London
Films set in Venezuela
Films using stop-motion animation
First National Pictures films
Professor Challenger films
Pterosaurs in fiction
Surviving American silent films
United States National Film Registry films
1920s American films
Silent adventure films
Silent horror films
Silent science fiction films